Tazehabad (also Romanized as Tāzehābād) is a village in Saheli Rural District, in the Central District of Babolsar County, Mazandaran Province, Iran. At the 2006 census, its population was 608, in 159 families.

References 

Populated places in Babolsar County